Cordylocera is a genus of soldier beetles (insects in the family Cantharidae).

Species 
 Cordylocera albovittata (Wittmer, 1964)
 Cordylocera antennata Guérin-Méneville, 1830
 Cordylocera atricornis Guérin-Méneville, 1838
 Cordylocera bacchusi (Wittmer, 1964)
 Cordylocera borneensis (Pic, 1910)
 Cordylocera cyclopensis (Wittmer, 1964)
 Cordylocera elegans (Wittmer, 1964)
 Cordylocera flabellata (Wittmer, 1964)
 Cordylocera flavonotata (Pic, 1925)
 Cordylocera helenae (Wittmer, 1964)
 Cordylocera humboldtensis (Wittmer, 1964)
 Cordylocera interrupta (Wittmer, 1953)
 Cordylocera ishuravaensis (Wittmer, 1964)
 Cordylocera japenensis (Wittmer, 1964)
 Cordylocera kennedyi (Wittmer, 1964)
 Cordylocera kokodaensis (Wittmer, 1964)
 Cordylocera leechi (Wittmer, 1953)
 Cordylocera limbatithorax (Wittmer, 1964)
 Cordylocera livida (Hope, 1831)
 Cordylocera longicornis (Wittmer, 1964)
 Cordylocera mafuluensis (Wittmer, 1964)
 Cordylocera nomoensis (Wittmer, 1964)
 Cordylocera palpalis Wittmer, 1969
 Cordylocera plutus (Wittmer, 1964)
 Cordylocera pseudomisolica (Wittmer, 1964)
 Cordylocera pseudonigriceps (Wittmer, 1964)
 Cordylocera quadriobscura (Wittmer, 1964)
 Cordylocera variipes (Wittmer, 1964)
 Cordylocera warisensis Wittmer, 1969
 Cordylocera wiederkehrae (Wittmer, 1964)

References

External links 

 
 Cordylocera at insectoid.info

Elateriformia genera
Cantharidae